Grabice may refer to the following places:
Grabice, Łódź Voivodeship (central Poland)
Grabice, Lubusz Voivodeship (west Poland)
Grabice, Opole Voivodeship (south-west Poland)